The Book of the Zodiac is a Mandaean text. It covers Mandaean astrology in great detail. The book is used to obtain a Mandaean's baptismal name (malwasha).

Manuscripts and translations
An English translation of the text, based on Manuscript 31 of the Drower Collection (DC 31), was published by E. S. Drower in 1949. The manuscript is a kurasa, or unbound manuscript consisting of loose sheets.

Buckley has also located a privately held copy of the Book of the Zodiac dating from 1919, which belonged to Lamea Abbas Amara in San Diego.

There is also a manuscript of the Book of the Zodiac from 1789 CE that is currently held at the Bibliothèque National in Paris, which was used by Drower and may have also been used by Nicolas Siouffi.

Contents
Drower's manuscript (DC 31) consists of 289 pages in Mandaic. There are 20 individual books or sections, which are:

Book 1: The Book of the Signs of the Zodiac for Men
Book 2: The Book of the Signs of the Zodiac for Women
Book 3: The Book of Stars
Book 4: lists of astrological terms and calculations
Book 5: The Book of the Moon
Book 6: charms against evil spirits
Book 7: charms against evil spirits
Book 8: The Days of the Month
Book 9: illnesses
Book 10: astrological information
Book 11: selecting days for certain activities
Book 12: The Opening of a Door
Book 13: predictions
Book 14: predictions
Book 15: predictions
Book 16: predictions
Book 17: geographical regions governed by the planets and zodiac signs
Book 18: predictions
Book 19: transits of Saturn, halos of the sun, meteors and comets, and rainfall
Book 20: meteorology

There is also an appendix (labeled as Part II in Drower's text) that discusses omens, predictions, remedies, eclipses, and other topics.

See also
Ginza Rabba
Mandaean Book of John

References

External links
Sfar Mulwasha (Mandaic text from the Mandaean Network)
Sfar Mulwasha (Mandaic text from the Mandaean Network)
Sfar Mulwasha (English translation)

Mandaean texts
Astrological texts